James Aloysius Bernard Bausch (March 29, 1906 – July 9, 1974), also known as "Jarring Jim", was an American athlete who competed mainly in the decathlon.

Bausch grew up in Garden Plain, Kansas, graduated from Cathedral High School in Wichita, Kansas, and went to college at the University of Kansas, where he starred in football and basketball. He competed for the United States in the 1932 Summer Olympics held in Los Angeles in the decathlon. Bausch only placed fifth after the first day, but splendid performances in the discus throw and pole vault helped him to build an insurmountable lead and win the gold medal over the heavily favored Finnish athlete Akilles Järvinen.

Bausch played college football at the Municipal University of Wichita, now known as Wichita State University, and the University of Kansas. He was inducted into the College Football Hall of Fame in 1954. Bausch also played professional football as a halfback in the National Football League (NFL) for the Chicago Cardinals and Cincinnati Reds.

After retiring from competitions, Bausch tried a career as a nightclub singer before becoming an insurance salesman. During World War II, while serving with the U.S. Navy in the Pacific, he contracted osteomyelitis, and the associated pain resulted in alcoholism. Bausch eventually overcame both problems, and in his later years helped other osteomyelitis patients.

References

External links
  More on Jim Bausch
 
 
 

1906 births
1974 deaths
American male decathletes
American football halfbacks
American men's basketball players
Athletes (track and field) at the 1932 Summer Olympics
Chicago Cardinals players
Cincinnati Reds (NFL) players
Kansas Jayhawks football players
Kansas Jayhawks men's basketball players
Wichita State Shockers football players
Olympic gold medalists for the United States in track and field
James E. Sullivan Award recipients
People from Turner County, South Dakota
Track and field athletes from Kansas
Track and field athletes from South Dakota
Basketball players from Kansas
Players of American football from Kansas
Medalists at the 1932 Summer Olympics
Track and field athletes in the National Football League
United States Navy personnel of World War II